Caty McNally was the defending champion, but lost in the quarterfinals to Anhelina Kalinina. 

Shelby Rogers won the title after Kalinina withdrew from final because of leg injury.

Seeds

Draw

Finals

Top half

Bottom half

References

External Links
Main Draw

Dow Tennis Classic - Singles